José Gregorio Valera was the president of Venezuela from 15 December 1878 to 13 February 1879. He was a half brother of his predecessor Francisco Linares Alcántara.
He was overthrown by the general , who proclaimed the new president of the country the former president Antonio Guzmán Blanco.

References 
  Official biography
  Биография
  Presidencia de José Gregorio Valera (1878–1879)
  José Gregorio Valera

Presidents of Venezuela
Year of birth missing
Year of death missing
Great Liberal Party of Venezuela politicians
Venezuelan Ministers of Defense
Venezuelan people of Spanish descent